The International Economic Association (IEA) is an NGO established in 1950, at the instigation of the Social Sciences Department of UNESCO. To date, the IEA still shares information and maintains consultative relations with UNESCO.  In 1973 the IEA became a federated member of the International Social Science Council.

The goal of the IEA is to promote personal contacts and mutual understanding among economists in different parts of the world through the organization of scientific meetings, through common research programs and by means of publications of an international character on problems of current importance.

Organization 
The IEA has two main bodies which rule the association: the council and the executive committee.

Council
The IEA is governed by a council, composed of representatives of all member associations as well as a limited number of co-opted members. The council meets triennially, when it reviews the general policy of the association and elects the president and other officers and members of the executive committee for a three-year term of office.

Executive committee
The executive committee, which numbers 15 members (and 3 advisors), decides, in the light of the general policies approved by the council, the subjects of specialists' conferences and other projects and selects the chairman of the Program Committee who will be entrusted with the scientific preparation of each project. The general practice is to invoke the aid of an economist of outstanding distinction in the subject who, with other members of the Committee chosen by him in consultation with the IEA officers and executive committee, undertakes the scientific planning of the program and is responsible for the subsequent publication. Decisions concerning the work of the association are taken by the president, in consultation with the other officers, the executive committee frequently being consulted.

Executive committee members

Assembles and Presidents

Membership 
The IEA is in effect a federation of national academic associations or committees representing the economists of each country. In 2020 it had 30 member countries and 8 association countries.  In the implementation of each project, invitations are sent to those individuals or research institutes - regardless of nationality - which appear in the circumstances to be best qualified to make a serious contribution to the study of the subject chosen.

Activities 

Regional conferences have been held in various parts of the world to study problems particular to the region. East-West conferences have provided an opportunity for economists from Eastern and Western Europe to meet and discuss problems of common interest.

Particular attention has been paid also to problems of concern to developing countries by devoting whole conferences or sections of conferences and congresses to these problems. In the case of the developing countries considerable efforts have been made, often with the help of subsidies from UNESCO, the World Bank and the European Commission and international organizations to facilitate the participation of economists from these countries in the work of the IEA.

In essence, the activities of the IEA during the 65 years of its existence may be summed up as follows:

1. The organization of 115 specialists' conferences of a round-table type and the publication of 154 volumes of proceedings.

2. The organization of fifteen open international congresses: Rome 1956, Vienna 1962, Montreal 1968, Budapest 1974, Tokyo 1977, Mexico 1980, Madrid 1983, New Delhi 1986, Athens 1989, Moscow 1992, Tunis 1995, Buenos Aires 1999, Lisbon, 2002, Marrakech, 2005, Istanbul, Turkey, June 2008, Beijing, China, July 2011 and Dead Sea, Jordan, 2014. Each of the Congresses was followed by some volumes of proceedings published by Palgrave Macmillan.

References

External links 
 

Economics societies
Organizations established in 1950
Members of the International Science Council